How You Been may refer to:

 "How You Been?", a song from Vendetta (Mic Geronimo album), 1997
 "How You Been?", a song from Thundamentals' 2011 album, Foreverlution
 "How You Been?", a song from Dreamteam's 2015 album, Dreams Never Die
 "How You Been", a song from Holy Holy's 2021 album Hello My Beautiful World

See also
 How Have You Been (disambiguation)
 How Are You (disambiguation)
 How Do You Do (disambiguation)